In September 2014 Mexican professional wrestling promotion Consejo Mundial de Lucha Libre (CMLL) held three CMLL Super Viernes shows on Friday nights. On September 19 they replaced the regular Friday night show with their 81st Anniversary Show, CMLL's biggest show of the year and the culmination of a number of storylines built up in the previous weeks or months. Some of the matches from Super Viernes are taped for CMLL's weekly shows that air on television in Mexico in the following week. The first two Super Viernes shows focused primarily on the build towards the 81st Anniversary show, especially the Lucha de Apuestas, mask vs. mask match main event of the show between Atlantis and Último Guerrero that would be the culmination of a storyline years in the making. It was also used to feature a quickly escalating storyline between Rey Cometa and Cavernario, leading up to one of the featured matches at the Anniversary Show. The post anniversary Super Viernes show featured the first round of the La Copa Junior VIP tournament, the second such tournament of 2014, this time featuring higher ranking wrestlers than the January 1, 2014 version. The tournament would continue into October 2014.

The Super Viernes events featured a number of professional wrestling matches, in which some wrestlers were involved in pre-existing scripted feuds or storylines and others were teamed up with no backstory reason as such. Wrestlers themselves portrayed either villains (referred to as "Rudos" in Mexico) or fan favorites ("Tecnicos" in Mexico) as they competed in matches with pre-determined outcomes. In total Super Viernes featured 24 matches, 6 matches each on September 5 and 12 and 12 matches total on September 27 due to the La Copa Junior tournament starting that week. 64 wrestlers appeared in matches during September, including six women and four Mini-Estrellas wrestlers. CMLL held one match featuring the women's division, one featuring the Mini-Etrellas and one Lightning match. Fuego, La Máscara, Mr. Niebla, Negro Casas, Último Guerrero, Valiente and Volador Jr. all appeared on all three Super Viernes shows in September and all but Fuego also worked the 81st Anniversary Show.

September 5, 2014

The September 5, 2014 Super Viernes was a professional wrestling event held by Consejo Mundial de Lucha Libre (CMLL) in their home arena Arena Mexico, the promotion's main weekly show. The focal point of the September 5 edition was the buildup of the storylines going into CMLL's 81st Anniversary Show only two weeks later to get spectators to attend the actual anniversary show. The show furthered the storyline of three of the matches on the Anniversary Show. The Anniversary Main event between Atlanis and Último Guerrero saw Guerrero team up with his son Gran Guerrero and Rey Escorpión to defeat Atlantis, Dragón Rojo, Jr. and Volador Jr. in the semi-main event of the night. The team of Negro Casas and Shocker were slated to defend the CMLL World Tag Team Championship against the Los Ingobernables (The Unruly") team of La Máscara and Rush two weeks later, to which end Los Ingobernables, including La Sombra defeated the tag team champions and Mr. Niebla in the main event. The fourth match of the night, a one fall, 10 minute match, Barbaro Cavernario wrestled rival Rey Cometa to a 10-minute time limit draw. Following the match challenges were laid out for a Lucha de Apuestas, or bet match for the Anniversary Show. The match was agreed to and was later announced that both Cavernario and Rey Cometa would put their hair on the line of the outcome of their match at the 81st Anniversary show.

After the semi-main event Australian wrestler Thunder made a surprise appearance after not being seen for approximately seven months. Thunder proceeded to turnerudo by attacking Volador Jr., throwing him outside the ring. To underscore the severity of the attack CMLL organized to have Volador Jr. taken from the arena on a stretch afterwards. The following day it was announced that Thunder would appear at the 81st Anniversary Show, teaming with Mr. Niebla and Euforia to fight Volador Jr., Máscara Dorada and Valiente.

September 5, 2014 Results

September 12, 2014

On September 12, 2014 Consejo Mundial de Lucha Libre (CMLL) held their weekly Super Viernes professional wrestling at their home arena Arena Mexico, presenting an event focused on continuing various storylines leading up to the CMLL 81st Anniversary Show that would take place the following Friday night in the same arena. In the main event Los Ingobernables (La Máscara and Rush) prepared for their CMLL World Tag Team Championship match by teaming with Diamante Azul to defeat champions Shocker and Negro Casas who teamed up with Mr. Niebla for the six-man tag team match. The previous week Thunder returned to CMLL after a seven-month absence and attacked Volador Jr. to signal his new rudo (bad guy) attitude. For the second week in a row Thunder came to the ring after the semi-main event and attacked Máscara Dorada, another one of his CMLL 81st Anniversary Show opponents.

September 12, 2014 Results

September 19, 2014

CMLL held a special show on September 19, 2014, replacing their regular Super Viernes show with the CMLL 81st Anniversary Show.

September 26, 2014

The September 26, 2014 Super Viernes professional wrestling event was the first Super Viernes held by Consejo Mundial de Lucha Libre (CMLL) after the CMLL 81st Anniversary Show the previous week. This marked the first time following his unmasking that Último Guerrero appeared in Arena México, fighting on the opposite side of the man that unmasked him, Atlantis. The newly unmasked Guerrero teamed up with the La Peste Negra ("The Black Plague") team of Mr. Niebla and Negro Casas to defeat Atlantis, Máscara Dorada and Valiente gaining a small measure of revenge for the loss a week prior. The show also hosted the first block of the La Copa Junior VIP, with the winner earning a spot it finals two weeks later. The eight competitors in Block A first faced off in a Battle Royal to determine the pairings for the actual tournament. The seeding battle royal was won by El Felino and La Máscara, which meant they would face off in the last of the four matches, while the first two faced off in the first match, the third and fourth man eliminated faced off in the second first round match and the fifth and sixth eliminated would wrestle in the third first round match of night. In the end Mephisto pinned Volador Jr. to move on to the finals of the tournament.

September 26, 2014 Results

September 2014 Super Viernes Competitors

References

2014 in professional wrestling
CMLL Super Viernes